Decaturville is an unincorporated community in Warren Township, Camden County, Missouri, United States. It is located on Route 5 approximately seven miles south-southeast of Camdenton. The Camden-Laclede county line is less than one mile south of the community.

The community was founded in 1854 and is named after Commodore Stephen Decatur Jr., (1779 – 1820), an American naval officer notable for his heroism in actions at Tripoli, Libya in the First Barbary War, the Second Barbary War, and in the War of 1812.

See also
 Decaturville crater

References

Unincorporated communities in Camden County, Missouri
Unincorporated communities in Missouri